Han Kun Law Offices (traditional Chinese: 漢坤律師事務所; simplified Chinese: 汉坤律师事务所) is a leading full-service law firm headquartered in Beijing, China with offices in Shanghai, Shenzhen, Haikou, Wuhan, Hong Kong, and Singapore. The firm has a strong focus on financing and investment-related areas, counting multinational companies, funds, and a number of top-notch companies from new economic sectors as clients. It is known to be one of China's most-elite and top-paying law firms.

In recognition of Han Kun's exceptional capabilities and leading position in the legal market, the firm was awarded "China Firm of the Year" at the China Law & Practice Awards 2021.

On May 8, 2021, China Business Law Journal announced its China Business Law Awards 2021, and Han Kun was awarded the "Golden League" award. The “Golden League” comprises eight elite full-service Chinese law firms.

The firm's working languages include Chinese, English, Japanese, Korean and German.

Han Kun is also exclusive China law firm member of WSG and Pacific Rim Advisory Council.

History 
Han Kun was founded in Beijing in 2004. 

In 2009, Han Kun opened its Shenzhen office, making it the firm's third office after Beijing and Shanghai. 

In 2014, Han Kun entered the Hong Kong market through an association with a Hong Kong law firm. 

In 2015, Han Kun entered into an alliance with Italian law firm Gianni, Origoni, Grippo, Cappelli & Partners, allowing the two firms to work together on advising clients in China and Hong Kong, as well as Chinese investors with investments in Europe.

In 2022, Han Kun reached a merger agreement with Shanghai-based Young-Ben. Young-Ben is a boutique law firm established in 2007 with a focus on finance and commercial dispute resolutions. According to the agreement, all Young-Ben partners, business departments, and administrative teams will join Han Kun's Shanghai office.

On April 18, 2022, with the approval of Hainan Provincial Department of Justice, the Haikou office of Han Kun was officially opened. 

In order to satisfy the growing demand for high quality legal services of clients from central China, the Wuhan office of Han Kun was officially opened on July 27, 2022. 

On November 28, 2022, Han Kun announced that Han Kun’s Hong Kong office and its Hong Kong associated law firm have officially merged, following approval by The Law Society of Hong Kong. Upon the merger, a local Hong Kong law firm operated by Han Kun under the name “Han Kun Law Offices LLP” was duly established. The merger will allow Han Kun to provide more effective, seamless legal services across Hong Kong SAR and the Chinese mainland.

Main practice areas 
Han Kun's main practice areas include:

Antitrust and competition
Aviation
Banking and Finance 
Capital markets & securities
Compliance
Dispute resolution
Family law
Financial technology
Foreign direct investment
Healthcare & life sciences
Infrastructure, project financing & real estate projects
Intellectual property
Mergers and acquisitions
Private equity and venture capital financings
Private funds/Asset management
Telecommunications, media and technology

Clients 
Han Kun's key clients include J.P. Morgan, UBS, Goldman Sachs, BofA Merrill Lynch, Tencent, Baidu, Bytedance, JD.com, Zhihu, Meituan, Vipshop, Nio, Air China, Vale S.A., Lenovo, Ericsson, Toyota, Samsung, AstraZeneca, Pfizer, Heineken, Schindler, Marriott, Audi, HP Inc

Corporate Social Responsibility 
Han Kun has had an active pro bono practice since its founding. The Firm have supported education, provided pro bono legal services and donated to disaster-stricken communities. Most notably, the Firm launched the Han Kun Youth Legal Scholarship to award exceptional young graduates with outstanding academic records. The Han Kun Youth Legal Scholarship aims to enhance the professional skills of Chinese legal practitioners, encourage outstanding legal talent to pursue advanced legal studies and promote the sustainable progress and prosperity of China's legal industry. Han Kun is also a member of TrustLaw Connect, a global pro bono service platform that connects NGOs and social enterprises with the best law firms around the world.

Rankings and awards

Chambers and partners

The Legal 500

IFLR 1000

References 

Companies based in Beijing
Law firms of China